Badou Jack is a Swedish professional boxer. He has won world titles in three weight classes, including the WBC cruiserweight title since February 2023, the WBC super-middleweight title from 2014 to 2017, and the WBA (Regular) light-heavyweight title in 2017. As an amateur, he represented the Gambia at the 2008 Olympics, reaching the first round of the middleweight bracket.

Amateur career
Jack began his amateur boxing career in 2001 at the age of 18. He held a record of 150 wins and 25 losses. He won Sweden's national championship five years in a row, 2004–2008, 4 times at middleweight and once at light heavyweight. Jack boxed for Djurgårdens IF.
In 2007, Jack was named the boxer of the year by the Swedish Boxing Federation. In his last national championship in 2008 he defeated fellow rising star Erik Skoglund in the finals. He represented Sweden at light-heavyweight before changing to Gambia, where he qualified for the 2008 Games.

At the 2nd AIBA African 2008 Olympic Qualifying Tournament he breezed through the competition to win; the final was a shutout win over DR Congo's Herry Saliku Biembe. 
Jack qualified for the 2008 Olympics for Gambia in the middleweight division, and was the nation's flag bearer at the Opening Ceremonies. He lost in the first round to India's Vijender Singh.

Professional career

Early career
Jack started his professional career in his native Sweden where he won his debut fight by unanimous decision on 6 June 2009. His next four fights were contested in Sweden and Finland, with Jack winning each by KO/TKO, two in the first round.

Fighting in the United States
In 2009, Jack met former heavyweight champion Shannon Briggs at a Swedish boxing event, held in honor of the Swedish boxing legend Ingemar Johansson, where Jack was fighting and Briggs was brought in as a guest. Jack would later move to the United States in 2010 to train with Briggs and eventually sign with Lou DiBella and the Warrior Boxing Promotions in 2011, bringing his 5–0 record over to the states.

In 2011 and 2012 Jack would fight and win 6 times. 4 by TKO and 2 by decision. Including defeating Adam Collins by TKO on 16 December 2011 and a unanimous decision over 6 rounds (60–54, 59–55 and 58–56) over Grover Young on 7 March 2012.
  
The biggest win came against fellow undefeated, 17–0, prospect Alexander Brand on 11 May 2012 by and eight-round split decision 77–75, 77–75, and 75–77.

Mayweather Promotions

Following his success extending his record to 11–0, Jack was spotted by Floyd Mayweather in a sparring session in opposite Andre Dirrell. Mayweather was impressed and quickly signed Jack to Mayweather Promotions and to his team. On 2 February 2013 he defeated Jonel Tapia by knockout in the first round. Three weeks later he fought Don Mouton 23 February 2013 and won by unanimous decision (78–74 on all scorecards). On 4 May 2013 Jack took on Michael Gbenga and won by TKO from a body shot in round 3. Jack fought Farah Ennis on 19 July 2013. Jack won the fight by unanimous decision 100–90, 98–92, and 98–92.

In his first title fight, Jack challenged Marco Antonio Periban for the NABF super middleweight championship on 12 September 2013. After 10 rounds the fight was scored as a majority draw. In his next fight he took on Rogelio Medina on 6 December 2013. He won the fight by TKO after scoring 3 knockdowns in round 6.

On 28 February 2014 Jack fought Derek Edwards and lost for the first time after being stopped by TKO in the first round. Edwards knocked down Jack twice in first round after catching him with an overhand right counter. Prior to the loss, Jack had been in line for an elimination bout against James DeGale. The upset result was also a candidate for Upset of the Year in 2014.

Jack got back into the win column on 30 August 2014 when he fought Jason Escalera at the Palms Casino and Resort, Pearl Theater in Las Vegas, Nevada, and won by unanimous decision 100–90, 100–90, and 99–91.

Jack's next fight was due to take place on 12 December 2014 against Mexican boxer Francisco Sierra at the Alamodome in San Antonio, Texas on the undercard of Erislandy Lara vs. Ishe Smith. Sierra gained 20 pounds between the weigh in and the opening bell, coming into the ring at 192 pounds. Jack dominated the fight from the start. The end came in round 6. Jack landed some combinations, which went unanswered by Sierra. The referee stopped the fight at 1:58 giving Jack the TKO win.

WBC super middleweight champion

Jack vs. Dirrell 
On 17 February 2015 it was announced that Jack would be challenging undefeated Anthony Dirrell (27–0–1, 22 KOs) for his WBC super middleweight championship. As a voluntary defence, Jack was given little chance, most thinking that he would be knocked out. Prior to the fight, Dirrell spoke to PBC about Jack being his next opponent, "[Jack is] nothing spectacular. He’s just a fighter. I’m going to go in there and stick to my game plan, not rush anything and take it however it comes." The fight took place on 24 April at the UIC Pavilion in Chicago, Illinois. Jack upset the boxing world by defeating Dirrell via majority decision 116–112, 115–113, and 114–114, taking more and more control of the fight as it went on and exposing the champions inability to fight on the inside. After the fight, Jack said, "I was in great shape and I believed in myself. All that talk don't matter. I knew they couldn't rob me. I thought I clearly won. It was a tough start to my career, but now, I'm a world champ."

Jack vs. Groves 
On 17 June 2015 it was announced that Jack would make his first defence against mandatory challenger George Groves (21–2, 16 KOs) on 22 August in Las Vegas. A venue hadn't been confirmed. This fight was Groves' third world title challenge, having lost back to back challenges against then world champion Carl Froch in 2013 and 2014 respectively. On 21 July, the fight was pushed back to instead take place on the undercard of Floyd Mayweather Jr. vs. Andre Berto on 12 September at the MGM Grand Garden Arena. There was no injuries as Showtime gave no reason as to why the fight was postponed. Jack was once again the underdog. Jack upset the odds again, defeating Groves. He dropped Groves in the first round and remained in control of the fight as it went on, making effective use of his body punches especially. He was victorious via split decision 115–112, 116–111, and 113–114. Groves felt as though he did enough to win and said, "Losing a world title fight is the worst feeling in the world." In October 2016, Jack admitted that Groves was the toughest opponent he had faced in his career so far.

Jack vs. Bute 
Jack was set to defend his title next against Julio Cesar Chavez Jr. on 30 April 2016. However, Chavez Jr. would later withdraw from the bout due to an injury. He was replaced by Lucian Bute. Where the winner would go on to fight the winner of DeGale & Medina in the fall in a super middleweight unification bout. The fight was declared a majority draw 117–111, 114–114, and 114–114 and, as such, Jack retained the title. The draw was controversial since it appeared as Jack had done enough to be handed the victory by all of the judges. Most of the media scorecards also had Jack as the winner by 3-4 rounds. However, on 26 May 2016 it was revealed that Bute had tested positive for a banned substance in the post-fight drug test. The substance found in Bute's test was ostarine (also called enobosarm), which is a performance-enhancing drug, not an anabolic steroid but is still said to increase stamina and recovery ability and produce similar results that steroids would. It has been on the World Anti-Doping Agency banned list since 2008. On 24 April 2017, the DC commission changed the outcome of the fight to a DQ win in favor of Jack.

Jack vs. DeGale 
Showtime Boxing confirmed that a unification fight between Jack and IBF world champion James DeGale (23–1, 14 KOs) was set for 14 January 2017. The fight was supposed to be announced for the fall of 2016, however it had taken a little longer for the negotiations to complete. The vacant Ring magazine title would also be at stake as well as the WBC and IBF titles. On 15 November, it was officially confirmed that the fight will take place at the Barclays Center in Brooklyn, New York. The first time both fighters would be fighting at the arena.

Jack retained his title after his fight was declared a majority draw when judge Glenn Feldman scored it 114–112 for DeGale and judges Julie Lederman and Steve Weisfeld both scored it 113–113 draw. Both fighters were knocked down during the bout, Jack hitting the canvas in the first round while DeGale was dropped in the twelfth. Post-fight Jack's promoter Floyd Mayweather Jr, complained about the result saying his fighter had done enough to win and calling the decision "bad for boxing." When DeGale said he wanted a rematch possibly in London, Jack stated he would do it light heavyweight, with Mayweather also saying Jack had become too big for super-middleweight. Jack's purse for the fight was $700,000, while DeGale made $750,000. According to CompuBox, Jack landed 231 of 745 punches thrown, a connect rate of 31%, more than DeGale, who landed 172 of 617, connect rate of 28%.

Light heavyweight 
On 16 January 2017, the WBC ordered negotiations to begin for Jack to make a mandatory defence against British boxer Callum Smith (22–0, 17 KOs). The deadline was set for 17 February, or it would go to purse bid. On 18 January, Jack officially vacated his WBC belt in order to move up to light heavyweight.

Jack vs. Cleverly 
On 19 June, Jack revealed that his team were working towards a deal for him to fight WBA (Regular) champion Nathan Cleverly. He expected when the fight gets announced, it would be on the undercard of Floyd Mayweather Jr. vs. Conor McGregor in Las Vegas on 26 August 2017. Jack's light heavyweight goal was to challenge WBC champion Adonis Stevenson, after Cleverly. On 19 July, according to sources, a deal was being close to being agreed from sides. On 27 July, the WBA ordered Cleverly to fight undefeated WBA interim champion Dmitry Bivol (11–0, 9 KOs), which would eventually establish a mandatory challenger for WBA (Super) champion Andre Ward.

On 9 August, however, Eddie Hearn confirmed that terms had been agreed for a fight between Jack and Cleverly. It was also reported that whether the WBA (Regular) title would be at state at this point was uncertain, as mandatory challenger Bivol was yet to agree a step aside fee. On 12 August, the WBA's Championships Committee granted special permission for the fight to be contested for their light heavyweight title. They also made it clear that the winner would need to negotiate a deal to fight Bivol by 11 September 2017. Jack won the WBA title on his light heavyweight debut via stoppage victory in round five. Cleverly had some success in round two, throwing and landing continuously without hurting Jack. In round four, Jack piled the pressure on Cleverly, who left himself open and ended up with a bloodied nose. The end came with Cleverly against the ropes and Jack pounding him with combinations. Referee stepped in and called an end to the fight at 2 minutes and 47 seconds of round five. At the time of stoppage, Jack had landed 172 punches of 442 thrown (39%), while Cleverly, who threw 409, only landed 82 punches (20%). In the post-fight, Jack said, "I wanted to box him and feel him out while establishing my jab. Then the plan was to break him down from there. The plan was to finish him." Cleverly stated that he suffered a broken nose in the third round. Jack also told Jim Gray of Showtime, "You can’t leave it in the hands of the judges. You have to go for the kill", referring to his previous fight decisions. Jack received a base purse of $750,000 and Cleverly earned $100,000. The next day, Cleverly announced his retirement from boxing at the age of 30.

Jack was set to enter a purse bid with Bivol per the WBA agreement on 25 September, but this was cancelled when Jack instead vacated the title on 23 September.

Jack vs. Stevenson 
After Jack defeated Cleverly, he began to call out WBC and lineal titleholder Adonis Stevenson, knowing that Stevenson had a mandatory challenger. Stevenson shrugged it off, claiming he was ready for anyone, "It was a good performance. He beat Cleverly now. So now he called me out and I'm ready. I'm ready to fight and I'm ready to unify the title." On 8 September 2017 promoter Yvon Michel disclosed that there was serious ongoing negotiations between Stevenson and mandatory challenger Eleider Álvarez (23-0, 11 KOs) to fight before the end on 2017. He revealed the fight would take place in Quebec. In September, Michel said that he had a difficult time finalizing a date and venue for the fight, which meant the fight could get pushed to the end of January 2018. He also responded to claims of Jack wanting to fight Stevenson, saying it would only be possible if it were a unification. Michel confirmed the fight would take place on Showtime in January 2018. Michel spoke to Showtime about not going head to head locally with David Lemieux's next fight, which would take place on 16 December on HBO. On 8 November, there was rumours stating that Stevenson would once again pay Álvarez a step-aside fee, in order to fight Jack. Álvarez spoke to TVA Sports saying, "I do not think I'm going to fight Stevenson. I do expect to receive that (step-aside offer), and then I will analyze it with my team." On 1 December, it was reported that GYM had offered Álvarez a step-aside deal which would give him 'a multi-fight agreement with six-figure guarantee per fight', with Stevenson being part of deal as well. On 6 December, the WBC announced that they would investigate into Stevenson's title reign and lack of mandatories. A week later, the WBC stated they would allow Stevenson to avoid Álvarez once again in order to fight Jack. The WBC went on to state they would order Álvarez to fight Ukrainian boxer Oleksandr Gvozdyk (14–0, 12 KOs) for the interim title. Álvarez withdrew from the fight before the purse bid was scheduled on 12 January 2018. On 24 January 2018 Showtime confirmed the fight would take place on 19 May in Canada. The Bell Centre in Montreal was confirmed as the venue.

On 11 April, news broke out from Álvarez's manager, Stephane Lepine that a deal was yet to be reached with Álvarez to be properly compensated. Yvon Michel admitted he was working on a deal to keep Álvarez happy and this was the same reason as to why tickets had not yet gone on sale for the Stevenson-Jack fight, which was a month away. On 18 April, it was announced that a deal had been reached for Álvarez to challenge Sergey Kovalev (32–2–1, 28 KOs) for the WBO light heavyweight title on HBO. Kovalev was originally scheduled to fight contender Marcus Browne in the summer of 2018, however due to having been arrested for domestic violence, Kovalev's promoter, Kathy Duva of Main Events got in contact with Álvarez's manager Lepine about a potential fight. Due to Álvarez fighting Kovalev, this meant the announcement of Stevenson vs. Jack would be imminent. On 23 April, the card was moved from Montreal and instead scheduled to take place at the Air Canada Centre in Toronto, Ontario, Canada. A day later, the official press conference was held to announce the fight.

Stevenson and Jack fought to a majority draw in a competitive bout. One judge scored the fight 115–113 in favor of Jack, whilst the remaining two judges overruled the decision, scoring the fight 114–114. Stevenson outpointed Jack in the early rounds being more active, however from round five, it was Jack who was the busier and accurate of the two. From rounds seven through ten, Jack out landed Stevenson 114–40 in total shots landed. It was in round ten where Jack was hurt from multiple body shots from Stevenson's right hand. Stevenson carried the momentum into round eleven but it was Jack who finished the fight stronger. In round seven, Stevenson complained to referee Ian John Lewis about low blows and in round eight, Jack was warned. Jack later explained Stevenson's cup was low, hence why the shots looked like low blows. With the draw, Stevenson retained his WBC and lineal titles for the ninth time.

During the post fight interviews, Stevenson told Steve Gray, "I won the fight because I hurt him in the body. I hurt him in the body and he got slowed down. I kept the pressure on him. He was moving and moving – slick, slick – but I touched him more of the time and I think I won this fight." Speaking on the third draw in his last four fights (before Bute was DQ'd for failed drug test), Jack stated, "I have no idea. It could be they’re jealous of Floyd (Mayweather). I’m one of Floyd’s top fighters. Maybe they don’t like Floyd. Maybe they’re trying to – you know, I don’t know. To be honest, I don’t know. I’ve gotta thank God for everything. … I can’t do anything about it. I thought I definitely won the fight, definitely won the fight. Nobody’s complaining and no judge had him winning." According to CompuBox Stats, Stevenson landed 165 of 622 punches thrown (27%), 87 of which were power shots landed to the body and Jack landed 209 of his 549 thrown (38%) The fight averaged 535,000 viewers and peaked at 611,000 viewers on Showtime. The fight aired on pay-per-view in Canada.

Jack vs. Browne 
In November 2018, speaking to Swedish news agency TT, Jack revealed he would not fight again in the year and would likely return in early January 2019. Light heavyweight upcomer Marcus Browne (22–0, 16 KOs) called out Jack to fight him in what was an 'open division' as both traded words on Instagram. Both boxers claimed they were available to take the fight next, A few days later, Jack stated he was open to fighting WBA champion Dmitry Bivol, after Bivol's successful defence against veteran boxer Jean Pascal. Jack also went on to explain that he did not turn down a fight against Bivol in 2018. According to RingTV.com on 26 November, a deal was close to being reached for Jack and Browne to fight on the Manny Pacquiao vs. Adrien Broner Showtime PPV undercard on 19 January 2019. On 17 December, the fight was announced to take place on the PPV undercard, taking place at the MGM Grand Garden Arena in Paradise, Nevada. Although both were ranked highly with the WBC, the fight would be contested for the WBA interim light heavyweight title. Browne was ranked #1 by the WBA and WBC and #7 by the WBO, while Jack was ranked #2 by the WBA, WBC and the WBO. Browne was 'honored and a privileged' to be able to fight on a big PPV undercard. He was also excited with the opportunity of fighting his first big name on his way to becoming a household name.

Browne used his youth, speed and power advantage to pound out a one-sided twelve round unanimous decision win over Jack, who suffered a horrendous cut on his forehead in round seven. The judges’ scores were 117–110, 116–111 and 119–108 in Browne's favor. Both boxers started fight off slow, but it was Browne who managed to do more to win the early rounds. In round seven, following an accidental clash of heads, a vertical cut appeared on Jack's forehead, with blood streaming down. The head clash seemed to be initiated by Jack, who according to Browne, was coming forward with his head all fight. Jack had his best round in round twelve, as he attacked Browne hard in landing some nice shots. At this point, Jack needed a knockout, but was not able to hurt Browne. He lacked the power, and had taken so much punishment. After the fight, Browne said, "He was a real tough competitor. He thought he would take me deep in the rounds and drown me but I came in shape. I used my athletic ability. I did what I do best -- box the crap out of people. I was too slick, too sharp." Jack did not stay long after the bout and was taken to a hospital. After being stitched up, Jack congratulated Browne, "I would like to thank all of the fans for your support! The cut was a nasty one, but I’m fine now, Alhamdulillah. Congrats to Marcus Browne who fought a great fight. Regardless of the cut he was the better man tonight. I am a warrior and will never quit. I dedicated this fight to the refugee children across the world who fight a much tougher fight than I did tonight. I will continue to fight for them until the end." Browne landed 145 of 515 punches thrown (28%) and Jack landed 66 of his 303 thrown (22%). Jack received $500,000 and Browne was guaranteed a $250,000 purse.

Jack vs. Pascal 
Next Jack would be booked for another world title fight, set for 28 December 2019 against the champion Jean Pascal (34–6–1, 20 KO's) for the WBA (Regular) light-heavyweight title and WBC Silver light heavyweight titles.
Pascal was ranked #3 by the WBC at light heavyweight. It was a close hard fought fight, where Pascal had the better start, winning the majority of the opening rounds and scoring a knockdown at the end of a right hook in round 4. However, Jack found his way back into the fight, using his jab and body punches to render damage to his opponent and win rounds. In the 12th and final round Jack returned the knockdown favor and dropped Pascal to the canvas with a overhand right and a flurry of right hooks. Even despite his success in the middle- and later rounds, and the big knockdown in the 12th, Jack once again found himself on the losing end of a close fight, losing by a somewhat controversial split decision (114–112, 112–114, 112–114).
According to CompuBox Fight Stats, Pascal landed 155 of 556 punches thrown (28%) while Jack had a bigger output, landing 244 of 632 punches thrown (39%). 
Due to the controversial result, talks of an immediate rematch started right away, with both parties interested in making it happen during 2020.

Jack vs. McKernan 
While a rematch between Jack and Pascal had been discussed for a while, instead Jack would be booked to fight Blake McKernan (13–0, 6 KO's) on 28 November 2020 at the Mike Tyson vs. Roy Jones Jr. card.
With McKernan's regular weight being at cruiserweight, it was first discussed that he would drop down and face Jack at light heavyweight. However, later it was revealed that Jack instead would move up to fight McKernan at cruiserweight. Jack also stated that he would like make a permanent move to cruiserweight later in the future. But he was also vocal about still wanting a second fight against Pascal, and many felt that the McKernan fight would be a fight for Jack to just stay active while waiting on the rematch. Jack declared that he would be donating all of his fight proceedings to charity, through the Badou Jack Foundation.
Jack had a dominant performance, winning the 8-round bout by a lopsided unanimous decision (80-72 on all scorecards).
As of statistics from CompuBox, Jack landed 203 of 520 punches thrown (39%) while McKernan only landed 92 of 471 punches thrown (20%).

Jack vs. Colina 
Jack and Jean Pascal had originally been scheduled to face each other in a rematch of their 2019 fight on the undercard of Floyd Mayweather Jr. vs. Logan Paul on 6 June 2021, but the rematch was canceled when it emerged on 28 May that Pascal had failed random Voluntary Anti-Doping Association-administered tests and had tested positive for three different banned PEDs: drostanolone, drostanolone metabolite and epitrenbolone. Pascal responded to the news, saying that he was "shocked and embarrassed". On 3 June, reports surfaced that Pascal had failed yet another drugs test, testing positive for a fourth banned substance, erythropoietin, also known as EPO. Jack responded to the news by labeling Pascal a "scumbag cheater".

On 1 June 2021, unbeaten Dervin Colina (15–0, 13 KO's) was announced as Jack's new short-notice opponent, replacing Jean Pascal on the card. The gulf in class was apparent very quickly, with Colina being deducted two points in the second and third round for excessive clinching. Jack dropped his opponent three times in the fourth round, forcing the referee to halt the contest, with Jack being declared the winner by fourth-round technical knockout.

Jack vs. Crossed 
Jack faced Samuel Crossed (11–1–1, 7 KO's) in a stay-busy fight on 26 November 2021, at the Motospace Dubai Investment Park in Dubai. The ten-round bout was broadcast by ESPN on the American continents, and could be seen on IFL TV by the rest of the world. Jack entered the fight as an overwhelming -4000 favorite, while most odds-makers had Crossed as a +1100 underdog. Jack won the second cruiserweight fight of his career by a second-round knockout. Referee called off the fight after Crossed was knocked down for the third time in the round.

Jack vs. Atiyo
Jack was initially scheduled to face Hany Atiyo on 14 May 2022, on the Mayweather Jr. vs. Moore. However, due to the death of the president of the United Arab Emirates, the event was postponed to 21 May 2022. Coming into the bout as a clear favorite, Jack knocked Atiyo out during the opening minute of the bout.

Jack vs. Rivera
Jack was then pitted against unbeaten Richard Rivera on the undercard of Oleksandr Usyk vs Anthony Joshua II on 20 August 2022. He won the bout via split decision.

WBC Cruiserweight champion
Jack then challenged Ilunga Makabu for the WBC Cruiserweight title on the undercard of Jake Paul vs Tommy Fury on 26 February 2023. He claimed the title via twelfth-round technical knockout.

Personal life
Jack was born to a Gambian father and a Swedish mother. He was raised in his father's religion of Islam and still adheres to it to this day. Jack now resides in Las Vegas, Nevada.

Jack is a close friend of the Swedish actor Joel Kinnaman. He has helped Kinnaman physically prepare for roles in Robocop and Suicide Squad.

Professional boxing record

See also
List of world super-middleweight boxing champions
List of world light-heavyweight boxing champions
List of world cruiserweight boxing champions
List of boxing triple champions

References

External links

Badou Jack - Profile, News Archive & Current Rankings at Box.Live

2007 Swedish championships results
African Olympic qualifications results

Year of birth missing (living people)
Living people
Swedish male boxers
Sportspeople from Stockholm
Swedish Muslims
Swedish people of Gambian descent
People with acquired Gambian citizenship
Gambian male boxers
Boxers at the 2008 Summer Olympics
Olympic boxers of the Gambia
World super-middleweight boxing champions
World light-heavyweight boxing champions
World cruiserweight boxing champions
World Boxing Council champions
World Boxing Association champions
Djurgårdens IF boxers